Walk a Crooked Path  is a 1969 British crime film directed by John Brason and starring Tenniel Evans, Faith Brook and Patricia Haines. The film is set at a boarding school where a man plans to murder his wealthy teacher wife. It is sometimes known as Twilight Man.

The film's sets were designed by the art director Wilfred Arnold.

Cast
 Tenniel Evans as John Hemming
 Faith Brook as Elizabeth Hemming
 Christopher Coll as Bill Coleman
 Patricia Haines as Nancy Coleman
 Clive Endersby as Philip Dreeper
 Georgina Simpson as Elaine
 Margery Mason as Aunt Mildred
 Georgina Cookson as Imogen Dreeper
 Peter Copley as Arnold Oberon
 Paul Dawkins as Inspector
 Barry Perowne as Unwins
 Robert Powell as Mullvaney

References

External links

1969 films
1969 crime films
Butcher's Film Service films
British crime films
1960s English-language films
1960s British films